In enzymology, a quinoprotein glucose dehydrogenase is an enzyme that catalyzes the chemical reaction

D-glucose + ubiquinone  D-glucono-1,5-lactone + ubiquinol

Thus, the two substrates of this enzyme are D-glucose and ubiquinone, whereas its two products are D-glucono-1,5-lactone and ubiquinol.

This enzyme belongs to the family of oxidoreductases, specifically those acting on the CH-OH group of donor with a quinone or similar compound as acceptor. The systematic name of this enzyme class is D-glucose:ubiquinone oxidoreductase. Other names in common use include D-glucose:(pyrroloquinoline-quinone) 1-oxidoreductase, glucose dehydrogenase (PQQ-dependent), glucose dehydrogenase (pyrroloquinoline-quinone), and quinoprotein D-glucose dehydrogenase. This enzyme participates in pentose phosphate pathway. It employs one cofactor, PQQ.

References

Further reading 

 
 
 
 
 
 

EC 1.1.5
Pyrroloquinoline quinone enzymes
Enzymes of unknown structure